Amphicnaeia albovittata is a species of beetle in the family Cerambycidae. It was described by Stephan von Breuning in 1971.

The specific epithet albovittata refers to its white vittae.

References

albovittata
Beetles described in 1971